The Leland Initiative was a five-year program of USAID to improve internet connectivity in Africa.  It was named after Mickey Leland.  Its implementation phase started in March 1996.

It is criticised for forcing connectivity through incumbent telecoms, which hampered countries’ nascent efforts for Internet connectivity.

References

External links

Information and communication technologies in Africa